The Cape Sebastian Sandstone is a Mesozoic geologic formation in the state of Oregon in the United States. Hadrosaurid dinosaur remains, such as the sacrum of the Cape Sebastian ornithopod (described in 2019), are among the fossils that have been recovered from the formation, although none have yet been referred to a specific genus. The formation dates to the Campanian stage of the Late Cretaceous epoch.

See also

 List of dinosaur-bearing rock formations
 List of stratigraphic units with indeterminate dinosaur fossils

Footnotes

References
 Weishampel, David B.; Dodson, Peter; and Osmólska, Halszka (eds.): The Dinosauria, 2nd, Berkeley: University of California Press. 861 pp. .

Maastrichtian Stage of North America